Carlos Adonys Mejía Estrada (born 19 February 2000) is a Honduran footballer who plays as an midfielder for F.C. Motagua in the Honduran Liga Nacional.

He made his professional debut with Vida at the age of 17, and was loaned out to Real España in 2019. In the summer of 2020 he was loaned out to second-tier Mexican side Pumas Tabasco.

He represented his country at the 2017 FIFA U-17 World Cup and the 2019 FIFA U-20 World Cup.

References

External links
 

2000 births
Living people
Association football midfielders
Honduran footballers
Honduras under-20 international footballers
Honduras youth international footballers
C.D.S. Vida players
Real C.D. España players
F.C. Motagua players
People from La Ceiba
Liga Nacional de Fútbol Profesional de Honduras players
Honduran expatriate footballers
Honduran expatriate sportspeople in Mexico
Expatriate footballers in Mexico
Liga de Expansión MX players